Rachel Noll James (Born November 21, 1985) is a filmmaker, actress, and screenwriter known for The Storyteller, Don't Pass Me By, Paramnesia, Follow the River.

Rachel's first feature film was "Don't Pass Me By", a film she wrote, produced, and starred in alongside Hollywood veterans Keith David, C. Thomas Howell and Sean Stone. Rachel won Best Feature Writer at the LA Femme Festival for the script, and the film was released worldwide in February 2014 by Gravitas Ventures. Rachel also wrote and produced the award winning feature The Storyteller which won her the Silver Prize in the PAGE Screenwriting Awards 2015.  Rachel also wrote, produced and starred in the award-winning short film Paramnesia that was selected to be a part of the acclaimed horror collective Fun Size Horror Volume 1, which made a splash in the LA festival scene, and was released worldwide in 2015. Around the same time, Rachel made her directorial debut with the short film Half Light. This film landed her as a quarter-finalist in the NexTV directing talent search. Rachel also wrote and directed the award winning short film Follow the River in 2018.   Rachel founded Emergence Films in 2015 with producer Sienna Beckman.

Early life and education

Noll grew up in Santa Fe, New Mexico, and attended Occidental College, where she graduated cum laude with a BA in theater.

Filmography

Films and television

 [[Comanche Moon (miniseries)|Comanche Moon']]' (2008) (uncredited)
 Monk (2009)
 A Reading of Tristan and Isolde (2009)
 The Interview (Short) (2011)
 Swing It (2011)
 Cross (2011)
 RID (2012)
 Batman Retired (2012)
 Me Without You (2013)
 Don't Pass Me By (2013)
 Epilogue (2014)
 Half Light (2014)
 Entity (2014)
 Paramnesia (2014)
 Fun Size Horror, Volume 1 (2015)
 What Did You Say? (2015)
 Eskimo Sisters (2015)
 The Storyteller (2017)
 Zero Point (2017)
 Heroes (2017)
 Risking it All (2017)
 Malibu Road (2017)
 The Caroling Epidemic (2017)
 Follow the River'' (2017)

References

External links
 

1985 births
Living people
American filmmakers